Adolf Hoel (15 May 1879 – 19 February 1964) was a Norwegian geologist, environmentalist and Polar region researcher. He led several scientific expeditions to Svalbard and Greenland. Hoel has been described as one of the most iconic and influential figures in Norwegian polar exploration in the first half of the 20th century, alongside Fridtjof Nansen and Roald Amundsen. His focus on and research of the polar areas has been largely credited as the reason Norway has sovereignty over Svalbard and Queen Maud Land in the Antarctica. Hoel was the founding director of the Norwegian Polar Institute and served as rector of the University of Oslo and as President of the Norwegian Society for the Conservation of Nature.

Honours
The mineral hoelite, the Adolf Hoel Glacier in Greenland and the Hoel Mountains in Antarctica are named in his honour.

Biography
Hoel was born in Sørum in Akershus, Norway.  He attended Hans Nielsen Hauges Minde in Oslo and the University of Oslo taking his cand.real. examination in 1904. He married Elisabeth Birgitte Fredrikke Thomsen in 1916.

Beginning in 1909 Hoel took part in about 30 Norwegian government-sponsored expeditions to Arctic areas, becoming also the main driving force behind Norwegian scientific activities in East Greenland. Hoel became a fellow of the University of Oslo in 1911 and a docent in 1919. In the second half of the 1920s Hoel took up the cause of Norwegian claims in East Greenland. Together with Gustav Smedal, Hoel eventually became the main leader of the "Greenland case" (Grønlandssaken) that tried to bring East Greenland under Norwegian sovereignty. Inspired by trapper Hallvard Devold the movement began to build a network of trapping stations, combined with surveying and exploring the almost uninhabited area. By 1929 the Norges Svalbard og Ishavsundersøkelser (NSIU) —"Norwegian Svalbard and Arctic Ocean Survey" established by Hoel in 1928, sent well-organized research expeditions to East Greenland. Expedition vessels also supplied the trapping stations with equipment financed by the Arctic Trading Co. (Arktisk Næringsdrift), a company that Hoel had helped to set up.

In 1933, he became a member of the Nasjonal Samling party of the former minister of defence, Vidkun Quisling, largely due to the Norwegian nationalist approach to the Norwegian occupation of a part of Greenland in the early 1930s. Hoel was appointed professor of the University of Oslo in 1940 and was rector of the university from 1941 to 1945, during the German occupation of Norway. He was the leading Norwegian researcher at Svalbard in the early 20th century, and in 1948 the Norges Svalbard- og Ishavsundersøkelser, which he had founded, became the Norwegian Polar Institute. He was President of the Norwegian Society for the Conservation of Nature from 1935 to 1945.

After World War II, he finished his work for the Norwegian Polar Institute on the history of Svalbard (Svalbard. Svalbards historie 1596-1965) which was published as a three-volume set after his death.

References

1879 births
1964 deaths
People from Sørum
University of Oslo alumni
Members of Nasjonal Samling
Norwegian environmentalists 
Academic staff of the University of Oslo
Rectors of the University of Oslo
People convicted of treason for Nazi Germany against Norway
20th-century Norwegian scientists
20th-century Norwegian educators
20th-century Norwegian geologists